The year 649 BC was a year of the pre-Julian Roman calendar. In the Roman Empire, it was known as year 105 Ab urbe condita . The denomination 649 BC for this year has been used since the early medieval period, when the Anno Domini calendar era became the prevalent method in Europe for naming years.

Events
 A revolt led by Shamash-shum-ukin is crushed by the Assyrians.
 Indabigash succeeds Tammaritu as a king of the Elamite Empire.
 Traditional date of the foundation of Himera by Zancle.

Births

Deaths

References